1. FC Magdeburg is a German association football club based in the city of Magdeburg. The club was founded in 1965 and spent all but one season in East Germany top flight, the DDR-Oberliga, winning three championships and seven cup titles. It is the only East German club to have won a European title, winning the European Cup Winners' Cup in 1974. After German reunification, the club fell on hard times and only entered professional football in 2015 when the side was promoted to the 3. Liga.

History

Football has been played in Magdeburg since the end of the 19th century. On 15 June 1896 SV Victoria 96 Magdeburg was founded, a club that had its best days before World War II, when it participated in the German championship finals on several occasions. Later the club participated in the Gauliga Mitte. After World War II, all sports clubs in the Soviet Occupation Zone were dissolved and a number of smaller clubs were created, which at first competed at a local and regional level. In 1945 players from the disbanded clubs Magdeburger SC Prussia 1899 and Cricket Viktoria Magdeburg formed Sportgruppe (SG) Sudenburg. This club and SG Lemsdorf came together as the sports club BSG Eintracht Sudenburg, which in turn merged with SAG Krupp Gruson in 1950. The next year the club was renamed BSG Stahl Magdeburg, and then in 1952, became BSG Motor Mitte Magdeburg. In 1957 the football department of Motor Mitte was moved to SC Aufbau Magdeburg, a political decision with the goal of achieving higher standards of performance. In 1965, the football department was again broken out of SC Aufbau Magdeburg and a pure football club was created, 1. FC Magdeburg. This was part of a general – again politically motivated – movement in East Germany towards football-only clubs with the goal of achieving higher standards. 1. FC Magdeburg is the oldest of the football clubs created in this period.

The 1960s
SC Aufbau Magdeburg were promoted to the first tier of East German football in 1959. At the beginning of the 1960s, the club usually played in the lower midtable of the DDR-Oberliga, but in 1964 the club had its first major success with a surprise win of the FDGB-Pokal. In the final at Dessau, SC Augbau Magdeburg came back from being 0–2 down to beat SC Leipzig 3–2. The cup win meant the first international appearance of a Magdeburg club, and SC Aufbau Magdeburg managed to hold Galatasaray to a draw – three times (the deciding match in Vienna ended 1–1, as well as the home and away legs), but went out on a coin toss. Legend reports that the coin first stuck upright in the muddy ground, and only the second toss brought about a decision.

SC Aufbau Magdeburg finished mid-table again in the 1964–65 season and managed to defend their cup title as the first team in East German football ever, beating FC Carl Zeiss Jena 2–1 in the final in Berlin. However, the 1965–66 season, when the football department of SC Aufbau Magdeburg was reorganized into football club 1. FC Magdeburg, ended in disaster: The club finished last in the table and was relegated to the second-tier DDR-Liga. However, in the UEFA Cup Winners' Cup, 1. FC Magdeburg managed to reach the quarter final, eventually going out against defending champions West Ham United featuring stars such as Bobby Moore and Geoff Hurst.

With their new manager Heinz Krügel, 1. FC Magdeburg were immediately repromoted and finished third in 1968 and 1969. With their third win of the FDGB-Pokal in 1969 the club had finally established itself among the top teams of East German football.

The 1970s

During the 1970s, the DDR-Oberliga was mostly dominated by two teams, 1. FC Magdeburg and SG Dynamo Dresden. One of the figures behind the success at Magdeburg was Heinz Krügel, manager of the first team. Under his reign, Magdeburg produced 9 East German internationals between 1969 and 1974 alone, four of which were part of the East German team competing at the 1974 FIFA World Cup. The golden age of Magdeburg football began in 1972, when the club won the East German championship with the youngest squad in history. 1. FC Magdeburg had a record attendance in this season, an average 22,231 spectators per game.

The following season Magdeburg finished third again. The club's European campaign ended in the second round of the European Cup with a 0–2 aggregate loss against Juventus. The home leg saw an attendance of 50,000 spectators. However, Magdeburg did not finish the season without a title, as they won their fourth FDGB-Pokal title with a 3–2 against 1. FC Lokomotive Leipzig.

The 1973–74 season is generally considered as the most successful in the history of 1. FC Magdeburg. Aside from winning their second East German championship, the club could celebrate the biggest success in club history when they won the Cup Winners' Cup against title holders AC Milan, beating them 2–0 in De Kuip in Rotterdam. 1. FC Magdeburg would be the only East German football club to triumph in a European competition.

In the next season, 1. FC Magdeburg defended their Oberliga title successfully and topped their record attendance once more, averaging 22,923 spectators. The European Super Cup that usually pitted the Cup Winners' Cup and European Cup winners against each other was not played, supposedly because the two clubs involved could not fit it into their schedules, but a political motivation has since been suggested, as West German powerhouse FC Bayern Munich would have been the opposition. However, the two teams were drawn against each other in the first round of the European Cup, and Bayern won both matches.

In 1976, Heinz Krügel was relieved of his duties as manager of 1. FC Magdeburg, as he had fallen into disgrace with the SED cadres. They considered him politically unreliable. His successor was Klaus Urbanczyk. 1. FC Magdeburg would not win any more championships, but always finished in the top four for the rest of the 1970s. In the FGDB-Pokal, 1. FC Magdeburg was more successful, winning the competition in 1978 and 1979, against Dynamo Dresden (1–0) and BFC Dynamo (1–0 a.e.t.).

The late 1970s saw 1. FC Magdeburg play against a number of famous teams in the European competitions. In the 1976–77 UEFA Cup, 1. FC Magdeburg went out in the quarter-finals against eventual winners Juventus, in the 1977–78 UEFA Cup Magdeburg met FC Schalke 04 and beat them 4–2 and 3–1, making 1. FC Magdeburg the only team to beat Schalke 04 in a European competition at their home Parkstadion. But 1. FC Magdeburg went out in the quarter-finals again, eventual winners PSV Eindhoven scoring the deciding goal with just 90 seconds left on the clock.

The 1980s

From the end of the 1970s, 1. FC Magdeburg did not have much more success in the league, aside from a third-placed finish in 1981. This had a profound effect on attendances: While until the 1976–77 season the club had averaged 18,000 spectators or more – with attendances of up to 45,000 against Dynamo Dresden or FC Carl Zeiss Jena, the season average had now dropped to a mere 13,000 spectators. Only with their seventh FDGB-Pokal title in 1983 was the club able to get back into the limelight – and with the club came the fans. About 25,000 fans supported their team in Berlin's Stadion der Weltjugend against FC Karl-Marx-Stadt, a club record for travelling fans that still stands today. However, it soon became clear that 1. FC Magdeburg had lost its position among the best clubs in East Germany, those were now BFC Dynamo, Dynamo Dresden and Lok Leipzig. This made qualification for the UEFA Cup via league position the only realistic goal in this period. But even in the UEFA Cup, 1. FC Magdeburg usually went out in the early rounds, albeit against reputable opposition, such as AC Torino, Borussia Mönchengladbach, FC Barcelona and Athletic Bilbao. The 1–5 home defeat against Barcelona (three goals by Diego Maradona) showed that the club from 1. FC Magdeburg was no longer able to keep up with Europe's footballing greats. From the mid-80s, attendances shrunk to around 10,000 spectators.

Only in the 1989–90 season did 1. FC Magdeburg compete for the championship until the final day. However, the team lost the decisive match against their direct competitors from Karl-Marx-Stadt and only managed to finish third in the table.

The 1990s

Grave mistakes by the club's management led to 1. FC Magdeburg losing touch with top-flight football. After the third place in 1990, hopes were high that the team would be able to qualify for Fußball-Bundesliga or at least Second Bundesliga in the 1990–91 season. However, the club could not compensate for losing manager Joachim Streich (to Eintracht Braunschweig) and a number of players (Dirk Schuster, Wolfgang Steinbach among others) and only finished tenth. In the qualification playoffs for the Second Bundesliga the club did not win a single game and found themselves in the tier III Oberliga Nordost/Staffel Mitte. Eventually, Magdeburg are ranked eighth in All-Time DDR-Oberliga Table. During the 1991–92 season Magdeburg managed to keep up with 1. FC Union Berlin, but eventually finished second, trailing the winners by thirteen points.

In the next season Magdeburg finished eighth, but winning the Saxony-Anhalt Cup meant qualification for the DFB-Pokal. Magdeburg met then Second Bundesliga club Wuppertaler SV and beat them 8–7 after penalties in a dramatic game. In the third round, holders Bayer 04 Leverkusen came to a sold out Ernst-Grube-Stadion and triumphed, Magdeburg was beaten 5–1. The 1993–94 season saw Magdeburg miss out in yet another qualification, finishing seventh because they had scored less goals than Hertha Zehlendorf. Magdeburg competed in tier IV now, finishing twelfth in Oberliga Nordost/Staffel Nord. This was the worst position the club ever finished in – and a mere 444 spectators came to see the matches on average.

In 1996–97 Magdeburg moved to Oberliga Nordost/Staffel Süd again. In this season, another Magdeburg team, Fortuna Magdeburg had been promoted to this league, leading to better attendance levels: Both derbies and the key match against FSV Hoyerswerda were watched by more than 10,000 people. FCM averaged 3,000 spectators in that season. Eventually, 1. FC Magdeburg could reaffirm their position as the number one club in the city, finishing first in the league and winning promotion to the Regionalliga Nordost.
In 1997–98 Magdeburg managed to stay in the third-tier Regionalliga and win the Saxony-Anhalt Cup for the second time and in the following year, the team competed for promotion to 2nd Bundesliga for a long time, but eventually finished third, raising hopes that the team would be able to qualify for the reduced Regionalligas in the following season. However, a tenth place meant relegation to tier IV once more. Consolation could only be found in the club's reserves winning the Saxony-Anhalt Cup for a third time.

Since 2000
Magdeburg had a very successful season in 2000–01. Not only did the club win their league in superior style, scoring more than 120 goals, but they also reached the quarter final of the DFB-Pokal. 1. FC Magdeburg beat Bundesliga side 1. FC Köln, holders FC Bayern Munich and Karlsruher SC, ultimately going out against eventual winners Schalke 04. Additionally the club won their fourth Saxony-Anhalt-Cup. In the promotion play-offs, Magdeburg beat their old rivals BFC Dynamo 5–2 on aggregate, but financially the club was in deep trouble. In order to be allowed to play, they had to raise 5 million DM in a matter of days. A two-day donation drive initiated by the fans brought 1 million Marks, the remaining sum was loaned to the club by two banks.

Magdeburg managed to remain in the league, finishing twelfth, and averaging 4,500 spectators, but in June 2002 the club had to go into receivership. This led to the club's relegation to tier IV, and almost all players left the club and 1. FC Magdeburg had to manage the next season with players from their youth department and their reserves. This young team finished tenth in the Oberliga Nordost-Süd and won the Saxony-Anhalt-Cup for a fifth time. Despite this negative development, average attendance stayed at the same level.

After the club had almost gone bust, its board restructured it and began to work at a slow, but steady reconstruction. In 2004, the city of Magdeburg resolved to build a new stadium, which meant that 1. FC Magdeburg had to move to the much smaller Heinrich Germer Stadium. The patient rebuilding of the squad paid off eventually, when the club was re-promoted to Regionalliga Nord in 2006. Additionally, Magdeburg won the Saxony-Anhalt-Cup for a sixth time.

The 2006–07 Regionalliga Nord season saw Magdeburg with the simple goal of non-relegation and setting the foundation for qualifying for the new 3rd Liga in the 2007–08 season. In December 2006 Magdeburg moved to their new stadium, dramatically increasing attendance. With their fans as support, Magdeburg started a run of great results after the winter break that opened up the opportunity to win promotion to the Second Bundesliga immediately, a feat only two other teams (FC Gütersloh and Carl Zeiss Jena) had achieved before. But despite having a five-point lead on the third-placed team three matchdays before the end of the season, Magdeburg eventually finished in a disappointing third place. In the Saxony-Anhalt-Cup the reserves won the club's seventh title.
In the following season the club missed out on qualification for the newly created 3rd Liga. After a terrible first half of the campaign with as little as 24 points from 21 matches, the board sacked manager Dirk Heyne and replaced him with Paul Linz. This proved to be a successful measure as the club moved to a qualifying spot with only two games to go. But a home defeat to Rot-Weiß Essen eventually destroyed all hopes of qualification and Magdeburg finished eleventh behind Eintracht Braunschweig on goal difference. Attendance remained high throughout the season, averaging 11,800 spectators.
For the first season in the new tier-IV Regionalliga Nord, the Magdeburg board gave out immediate repromotion as the team's goal. As only one player had a valid contract for the new league, the club was forced to bring in a large number of new players. Especially in the midfield virtually none of the previous season's squad was retained. With just the top spot bringing promotion, the task for manager Linz was exceptionally difficult. But in spite of the challenge of forming a team from scratch, the majority of managers in the league declared Magdeburg the top candidate for promotion. Following a drop to fourth place in March, the club sacked manager Paul Linz and hired former player Steffen Baumgart as his successor. Baumgart signed a contract until June 2009.

Despite a mediocre record in the league, Baumgart' contract was extended another year until June 2010. Promotion was still the target for Baumgart's team, but after the winter break the distance to the promotion spot had increased so much that the board decided to let Baumgart go. Carsten Müller was appointed as an interim manager with the goal of at least winning the Landespokal, but even that failed. For the following season, Magdeburg signed Ruud Kaiser as manager, tasked with building a team capable of winning the league within two years. However, after a string of bad results brought the side dangerously close to relegation, Kaiser was let go and succeeded by Wolfgang Sandhowe.

Sandhowe stayed on as manager for the next season, but was unable to get results. Hence he was replaced by assistant manager Ronny Thielemann in October. The continuing string of bad results that saw Magdeburg slip to last place led to Thielemann's dismissal from the manager role. Detlef Ullrich became the new manager in March, with Thielemann working as assistant manager. Towards the end of April, the club presented Andreas Petersen as the manager for the next season and on 3 May announced that Detlef Ullrich had been relieved of all duties, with Carsten Müller again serving as the interim manager for the remaining three matches.

After finishing bottom of the league at the end of the 2011–12 season, new manager Andreas Petersen led the club to a 6th-place finish in his first and a 2nd-place finish in his second season, winning the Landespokal on both occasions. Despite this, the board announced in March that the contract with Petersen would not be extended. A month later, the club presented Jens Härtel as his successor. Härtel signed a two-year contract.

2016–present
Having qualified for the DFB-Pokal and finished second in the league, the club set their eyes firmly on finishing first in the new season, with promotion to the 3. Liga as the eventual goal. To that end, a number of experienced players were signed, such as Silvio Bankert, Marcel Schlosser and Jan Glinker, in order to increase quality in the squad. Magdeburg won the Regionalliga Nordost and thereby earned the right to take part in the promotion round to the 3. Liga. They faced Kickers Offenbach, winners of Regionalliga Südwest. Magdeburg won 1–0 at home on 27 May 2015 and 3–1 away on 31 May 2015 and returned to third level after 7 years. This also meant that the club would compete in a fully professional league for the first time since reunification. Magdeburg finished the inaugural 3. Liga season in fourth place and qualified for 2016–17 DFB-Pokal. Finishing in 1st place at the end of the 2017–18 season Magdeburg achieved promotion to 2. Bundesliga. Their spell in the 2. Bundesliga was short lived and on 12 May 2019 they were relegated back to the 3. Liga alongside MSV Duisburg.

Stadium

For over 40 years, 1. FC Magdeburg's home stadium was the Ernst-Grube-Stadion. In 2005, the stadium which had decayed rapidly after German reunification was demolished to make way for a new, football-only stadium. In December 2006 the new Stadion Magdeburg was opened, it is fully covered and offers room for 27,250 spectators. As it is usual in Germany, there is standing room for 4,500 people that can be converted to seats to make the stadium a 25,000 capacity all-seater for international matches. In July 2009, local ISP and cable TV company MDCC announced they had signed a five-year sponsorship agreement with the stadium operator under which the stadium would be known as MDCC-Arena.

Fans

While the average attendance has had its ups and downs in recent years, 1. FC Magdeburg traditionally had a large number of supporters. At an average away match, the club will bring several hundred fans, but for important matches or derbies, this number can increase into thousands. 5,000 fans accompanied their club to the away match against Eintracht Braunschweig in the 2007–08 season. A similar number traveled to the match against VfL Wolfsburg II. While there are claims that in 1983 some 25,000 fans traveled to Berlin to see the FDGB-Pokal final against FC Karl-Marx-Stadt in the Stadion der Weltjugend, Berliner Zeitung only reports 8,000 Magdeburg fans.

After the new stadium was opened, fans were found in two different sections for a time, but are now mainly found behind the goal in sections 3 through 5. They refer to themselves as Block U, a reference to the initial plan of designating the various sections of the new stadium with letters instead of numbers. Block U unites a number of different ultra and fan groups. Currently, 49 fan clubs have registered with 1. FC Magdeburg.

Magdeburg have fan rivalries with Hallescher FC and Dynamo Dresden. The rivalry with Hallescher FC centers around the question of being no. 1 in Saxony-Anhalt, while the Dresden rivalry can be traced back to the 1970s, when both clubs formed the elite of East German football. There is a friendly relation to Eintracht Braunschweig, accepted by a large part of Magdeburg supporters. Some, however, merely respect the friendship, while remaining generally critical. The fans have also friendly relations with fans of Polish team Hutnik Kraków, as well as Welsh club Wrexham AFC (against whom they played in the Cup Winners Cup in 1979–80).

Honours

European
UEFA Cup Winners' Cup
 Winners: 1973–74

League
DDR-Oberliga
 Winners: 1971–72, 1973–74, 1974–75 
 Runners-up: 1976–77, 1977–78
DDR-Liga (II)
 Winners: 1966–67
 Runners-up: 1954–55, 1959 
3. Liga (III)
 Winners: 2017–18, 2021–22

Cup
FDGB-Pokal 
Winners: 1963–64, 1964–65, 1968–69, 1972–73, 1977–78, 1978–79, 1982–83 (record shared with SG Dynamo Dresden)
 DFV-Toto-Sonderrunde (de)
 Winners: 1976

Regional
NOFV-Oberliga Mitte (III)
 Runners-up: 1991–92
Regionalliga Nordost (IV)
 Winners: 2014–15
 Runners-up: 2013–14
NOFV-Oberliga Süd (IV)
Winners: 1996–97, 2000–01, 2005–06
Saxony-Anhalt Cup (III-VII) 
 Winners: (13) 1993, 1998, 2000, 2001, 2003, 2006, 2007, 2009, 2013, 2014, 2017, 2018, 2021, 2022 (record)
 Runners-up: 1994, 2008, 2016

Double
1973–74: League and Cup Winners' Cup

Players

Current squad

Notable former players

Jürgen Sparwasser, 57 DDR caps (1969–77), well known for his goal against West Germany in the 1974 FIFA World Cup
Martin Hoffmann, 66 DDR caps
Jürgen Pommerenke, 57 DDR caps
Joachim Streich, 98 DDR caps. Holds both the records for most appearances and most goals scored in the national team.
Wolfgang Steinbach, 28 DDR caps
Dirk Stahmann, 46 DDR caps
Detlef Schößler, 18 DDR Caps
Uwe Rösler, 6 DDR caps
Anatoliy Demyanenko, 80 USSR Caps
Denis Wolf, 14 PHI caps

Managers

Magdeburg in European competitions

European record

Youth teams
1. FC Magdeburg's U19 team is coached by Olympic gold medalist Martin Hoffmann. For the 2010–11 season the team competes in the U19 Bundesliga, the top flight league it had competed in during the 2007–08 season. Talents from the club's youth teams make the step up to the men's team on a regular basis. Altogether, more than 200 players of all ages compete in the youth teams. All but the U19 and U17 teams play in their respective top flights. In 1999, the Magdeburg U19 team became the first team from former East Germany to win a national title in unified Germany, winning the U19 DFB-Pokal.
27 coaches take care of the youth teams, the club has established a youth academy and offers room and board for a number of youth players. Cooperation agreements with the Sportgymnasium Magdeburg (a high school with an intense focus on sports) and a number of medical institutions in Magdeburg have been signed to aid with promoting talent from the youth teams.
Another part of the youth setup is the U23 team, seen as a transition stage between youth and men's teams.

Youth team honors
East German Junior Championship (de)
 Winners: (5) 1963, 1964, 1965, 1970, 1989
 Runners-up (6): 1961, 1962, 1969, 1978, 1980, 1986
East German Youth Championship (de)
 Winners: (3) 1966, 1968, 1980
 Runners-up: 1972, 1981, 1987
East German School Youth Championship (de)
 Winners: (7) 1966, 1969, 1971, 1972, 1977, 1978, 1987   (record)
 Runners-up: 1960, 1980, 1990
East German Junior Cup (Junge Welt-Pokal) (de)
 Winners: 1970, 1984
U19 DFB-Pokal (de)
Winners: 1999
U17 NOFV Cup (de)
Winners: 2000, 2005

References

External links

 
Supporters Club – FanRat e.V. (archived)
The Abseits Guide to German Soccer

 
Association football clubs established in 1965
Football clubs in Germany
Football clubs in East Germany
Football clubs in Saxony-Anhalt
1965 establishments in East Germany
UEFA Cup Winners' Cup winning clubs
Sport in Magdeburg
2. Bundesliga clubs
3. Liga clubs